Raven Songs 101 is a spoken-word album by Kevin Max and Adrian Belew. It features Max reading several poems from his book The Detritus of Dorian Gray. Belew provides the music and sound effects.

Raven Songs was re-released as a digital download on April 7, 2009 by Max's current label, dPulse Recordings.

Track listing
"One" – 2:34
"Raven Song 101" – 1:45
"Whalers Tales" – 1:58
"Black Leather and a Microphone" – 3:25
"And You Tremble at His Feet" – 1:18
"Swing" – 1:59
"River" – 5:07
"When the Dawn Comes" – 1:13
"Raising Cain" – 3:37
"Untitled" – 2:26
"Time the Fever to a Boil" – 4:04

References

External links 
 

Kevin Max albums
Adrian Belew albums
2004 albums
Albums produced by Adrian Belew
Spoken word albums by American artists